25th (County of London) Cyclist Battalion was a bicycle battalion of the London Regiment of the British Army. 
The battalion was converted to a unit of the Royal Corps of Signals in 1922.

The unit was originally formed on 26 February 1888 as the 26th Middlesex (Cyclist) Volunteer Corps, as part of a growing interest in the use of bicycles for military uses. It originally comprised three troops lettered 'A' to 'C' and was originally linked to the King's Royal Rifle Corps. It was attached to the Inns of Court Regiment and was affiliated with the Rifle Brigade (The Prince Consort's Own).

In 1908  on the formation of the Territorial Force as part of the Haldane Reforms the unit became part of the newly created London Regiment.

Men from the unit took part in the campaign in Waziristan (1919), 3rd Afghan War and some were present at the Amritsar Massacre in 1919.

Memorials
Its First World War memorial is located in All Saints Church, Fulham.

References

Bibliography
 Maj R. Money Barnes, The Soldiers of London, London: Seeley, Service, 1963.
 Ian F. W. Beckett, Riflemen Form: A study of the Rifle Volunteer Movement 1859–1908, Aldershot: Ogilby Trusts, 1982, .
 Osborne, Mike, 2006. Always Ready: The Drill Halls of Britain's Volunteer Forces, Partizan Press, Essex. 
 Ray Westlake, Tracing the Rifle Volunteers, Barnsley: Pen and Sword, 2010, .

25
London
Military units and formations in London
Military units and formations in Fulham
Cyclist battalions of the British Army
Military units and formations established in 1888
Military units and formations disestablished in 1922